Thomas Bateson, 1st Baron Deramore DL (4 June 1819 – 1 December 1890), known as Sir Thomas Bateson, 2nd Bt from 1863 until 1885, was a British peer and Conservative Party politician.

Early life
Bateson was the son of Sir Robert Bateson, 1st Baronet, of Belvoir Park, County Down and Catharine Dickson. After attending the Royal Military College, Sandhurst he served as an officer in the 13th Light Dragoons. He attained the rank of captain.

Politics
Bateson was first elected to the House of Commons in 1844 as a Conservative Member of Parliament (MP) for County Londonderry, but he resigned this seat in 1857. He was returned again in 1864 as a member for Devizes, which seat he retained until 1885. Bateson served as a Junior Lord of the Treasury in Lord Derby's short-lived 1852 protectionist government.

He had succeeded to his father's baronetcy following his death in 1863. In 1885 he was created Baron Deramore, of Belvoir, in the County of Down in the Peerage of the United Kingdom. As he had no sons, both the baronetcy and the barony passed by special remainder to his younger brother, George, who became the second baron and third baronet. Bateson served as a deputy lieutenant for Down.

Marriage and issue
On 24 February 1849 he married Hon. Caroline Elizabeth Anne Rice-Trevor, the second daughter and co-heiress of George Rice-Trevor, 4th Baron Dynevor. They had two daughters:
Hon. Eva Frances Caroline Bateson (died 18 May 1940), married David Alfred Ker
Hon. Kathleen Mary Bateson (died 20 Jul 1935), married Walter Randolph Farquhar

References

External links 

1819 births
1890 deaths
13th Hussars officers
Barons in the Peerage of the United Kingdom
Bateson, Thomas
Deputy Lieutenants of Down
Graduates of the Royal Military College, Sandhurst
Irish unionists
Bateson, Thomas
Bateson, Thomas
Bateson, Thomas
Bateson, Thomas
Bateson, Thomas
Bateson, Thomas
Bateson, Thomas
Bateson, Thomas
Bateson, Thomas
UK MPs who were granted peerages
Conservative Party (UK) hereditary peers
Peers of the United Kingdom created by Queen Victoria